The royal treasurer, or simply treasurer, also royal purse-bearer, was an official in the Hungarian royal court, existed around from the 1320s to the 16th century. The position evolved from the royal dignity of Master of the treasury, which gradually adopted more and more judiciary functions over the centuries, thus the newly established royal treasurer put in charge of collecting and administering royal revenues in practice.

History

Origins
The Master of the treasury (also translated as Lord High Treasurer, as its function was similar to its English equivalent) was initially responsible for collecting and administering royal revenues and prerogatives (regalia), especially when royal properties were considerably reduced under King Andrew II of Hungary (r. 1205–1235). For the upcoming decades, the Master of the treasury's sphere of authority had significantly enlarged by adopting important judiciary functions over financial matters and turned into the highest judges of the realm after the Palatine and the Judge royal. According to historian Győző Ember, the tasks were so hyperproliferative that the office-holder was no longer able to perform them alone. Thus a separate position was established during the reign of King Charles I of Hungary (r. 1308–1342), which dignity later became a permanent position with circumscribed legal powers.

The first office-holder of the royal treasury is generally regarded by the relevant historiography to have been Paul Magyar, whom king Charles I called his royal treasurer for the first time in 1340. Magyar initially acted as the deputy of Thomas Szécsényi, the then Voivode of Transylvania, who also took the Master of the treasury's financial tasks as procurator (thus acting official) following the death of the influential and innovative Demetrius Nekcsei (died in 1338). According to this widely accepted theory, Szécsényi was unable to perform the two functions at the same time because of the spatial distances, thus a local deputy (Magyar) was appointed to assist him. In contrast, historian Pál Engel considered a certain Demetrius, son of Peter as the first royal treasurer, who held the dignity from 1359 to 1370, during the reign of King Louis I of Hungary (r. 1342–1382), and also served as Bishop of Transylvania after 1368, later Archbishop of Esztergom (1376–1387). According to Engel, the office of treasurer was emerged into permanent status by 1377, possibly on the initiative of Demetrius himself.

However medievalist Boglárka Weisz argues that references for the dignity had already appeared in royal charters from the 1320s. A certain noble, Michael was mentioned as "treasurer of the royal court" in 1323. Charles I already referred to Paul Magyar as "thesaurarius noster" in 1325 (in the previous year, he was only castellan of Gímes yet). Two years later John, Canon of Fehérvár (held that ecclesiastical position between 1313 and 1345) was mentioned as "tezaurarius regalis et custos ecclesie Albensis" by a royal charter. Paul Magyar already served as „major of the tárnoks" from 1323 to 1326, which meant the supervision over the tárnoks (financial officials).

Functions and reforms
The royal treasury located in Buda. The treasurer became responsible for collecting tax from the royal towns and also received the accounts of the chamber counts. Initially, however, the Master of the treasury preserved several important financial functions – coinage, collecting chamber's profit (lucrum camerae) and mining duties. Already Demetrius oversaw the treasury's goods and gifts (munera), and also retained and stored the royal charters on estate donations. According to Weisz, the royal archives was established in Visegrád Castle.

The first office-holder who seems to have been valued for his financial expertise, was Nicholas Zámbó, appointed to the position in 1377. As a loyal supporter of Dowager Queen Elizabeth of Bosnia, he administered the royal revenues with the title of archtreasurer, and later promoted to Master of the treasury in 1382. During the Peace of Turin in 1381, Zámbó personally received the annual tribute of 7,000 ducats which the Republic of Venice should pay to the crown of Hungary. By the end of the 14th century, the office of royal treasurer became almost entirely independent from the Master of the treasury, when the direction and control of finance were placed in the hand of the royal treasurer, separated off the administration of justice performed by the Master of the treasury. The two functions officially separated and sanctioned by the laws of 1405. Thus the Master of the treasury lost all of his economic role under the Angevin kings. The supervision of the tárnoks and royal estates transferred to the so-called „major of the tárnoks", while the
administrative part in the government of the royal estates were assumed by the royal treasurer.

By the middle of the 15th century, the royal treasurer became the most influential member of the royal council. He was in charge to handle part of land-grants, administrated inland and customs revenues, as well as mining royalties, remitted the defrayments of the treasury, but also reported on military and executive matters of the royal castles and towns. The private landowners' income, however, belonged to the tasks of the castellan of Buda. As the direction of economic policies were not involved in the competences of the royal treasurer, the office had never become one of the great baronial dignities of the realm. Thus the royal treasurer was consequently omitted from the lists of baronial officers in the royal charters.

The office of royal treasurer was mostly a confidant position, which provided an opportunity to build informal influence. One of the most notable royal treasurers, John Ernuszt inspired Matthias Corvinus's reform of the royal revenues, especially the centralization of their administration and the abolishment of previous tax exemptions. So, in practice, the royal treasurer could set a direction for national economic policy. A staff of experts was formed around the royal treasurer in the 15th century: the treasury already had a vice-treasurer, secretary and notary by the end of the 15th century. Frequently the royal treasurer himself issued charters composed by his staff members, and only in some important matters of nationwide interest had the royal chancellery to issue the document.

However, sometimes this informal influence proved to be drawback for the royal treasurers, who usually became victims of the power struggles between the barons. For instance the Estates of the realm passed decrees about the collection and administration of the royal revenues in the absence of Matthias in 1474. The barons, who did not support the King's war for the Bohemian Crown, initiated hat taxes were to be spent on the defence against the Ottoman Empire. At the demand of the Diet, John Ernuszt promised that he would execute the new laws. After his return to Hungary, the king made Ernuszt a scapegoat for the decisions adopted at the Diet, but did not dismiss him. His son, Sigismund Ernuszt also served as royal treasurer since 1494. At the Diet in 1496, Sigismund was accused of having embezzled royal tax revenues. King Vladislaus II (r. 1490–1516) ordered to arrest him and was only released after he paid a large ransom and proved his innocence with a large-scale account. In 1509, Benedict Batthyány was also arrested as a result of his opponents's successful intrigues. The notable merchant Alexius Thurzó was imprisoned too following the death of his mentor Archbishop George Szatmári, and the Fugger–Thurzó property was even confiscated for a short time in 1525.

End of the office
During the Jagiellonian era, the lesser nobility have gained prominence through the Diet at the expense of the barons and the royal council. This also affected the position of royal treasurer. In 1507 the Diet determined by law that no dignity could be filled without the royal council’s consent (which was filled with lesser nobles after 1498), and in 1511, the collection and supervision of the extraordinary tax was taken away from the royal treasurer and entrusted to a baron (Stephen Telegdi) and a lesser nobleman (Ladislaus Szentpéteri) as elected officers of the Estates. This method was applied again in 1518 and after the fall of Belgrade in 1521.

After the disastrous Battle of Mohács on 29 August 1526, the Kingdom of Hungary divided into two parts, while the central authority collapsed. John Zápolya and Ferdinand of Habsburg were both elected kings of Hungary, on 10 November and 17 December, respectively. Ferdinand I reorganized the state administrative structure by the introduction of the Austrian practice; he established the Hungarian Chamber in 1528, a board functioning on a permanent basis. Although its first president, Nicholas Gerendi still bore the dignity of "thesaurarius" based on the continuity, but his successors finally abandoned the title. John I, whose realm meant the survival of Hungarian administrative tradition, retained the position. The last office-holder George Martinuzzi styled himself "royal treasurer" until his murder in 1551, but the dignity effectively ceased to exist with the death of John Zápolya in 1540.

List of royal treasurers

Fourteenth century

Fifteenth century

Sixteenth century

Elected treasurers

See also
Kingdom of Hungary (1301–1526)
Coinage in the Kingdom of Hungary
Master of the treasury

References

Sources 

 
1320s establishments in Europe
1540 disestablishments in Europe